Joshua Onujiogu (born March 3, 1998) is an American football outside linebacker for the Seattle Seahawks of the National Football League (NFL). He played college football for the Framingham State Rams.

Professional career
On May 2, 2022, the Seattle Seahawks signed Onujiogu as an undrafted free agent.  On August 31, he was waived. He was re-signed to the practice squad on September 2. On November 5, Onujiogu was elevated to the active roster, and made his NFL debut the following day against the Arizona Cardinals, recording three tackles while appearing on 17 snaps. He was signed to the active roster on January 7, 2023.

References

1998 births
Living people
American football linebackers
Framingham State Rams football players
Seattle Seahawks players